Raoul Lionel Chen (born 2 November 1990), better known as Diztortion, is a Dutch-born songwriter and record producer, best known for his work with UK-based artists Stylo G, Lethal Bizzle, Tinie Tempah and Sigma.

His first notable release was "Soundbwoy" by Anglo-Jamaican dancehall artist Stylo G. In May 2015, Diztortion scored notable success with Lethal Bizzle on "Fester Skank", the song reached number 11 in the OCC UK Charts. The record was also used in the BT Sport Advertisement for the UEFA Champions League.

Early life
Diztortion was born in Amsterdam, Netherlands, and is of Surinamese background.

Career

Having grown up in Amsterdam and spending years mastering his craft as a producer, rapper and singer, Diztortion decided to move to the UK
in late 2012, he signed to 2-Tone Entertainment to further his career after his underground success in the Netherlands.

He began to bring a new sound which drew upon UK grime culture and took influences from his musical background of hip hop, electro house, R&B and reggae. After setting up his recording studio in London he began working with the likes of Stylo G, Lethal Bizzle, Major Lazer and Wiley.

In March 2013 Diztortion scored his first top 20 hit with "Soundbwoy" by Stylo G. The track was A-listed on BBC Radio 1 and has over 1 million views on YouTube.

Lethal Bizzle then released the Diztortion produced "They Got It Wrong" which featured English grime artist Wiley. Diztortion continued his success in 2013 with Lethal Bizzle "Party Right", which reached 29 in UK OCC Chart and the club anthem "Badd" for Stylo G.

2014 saw Diztortion score more hits with Lethal Bizzle - "The Drop" reached number 20 in the OCC and "Rari Workout" which reached 11 in UK OCC Chart.

In August 2014 Diztortion signed a record deal with Polydor and Universal Records and also signed a publishing deal with Warner/Chappell. The first solo single was released in late 2014 and featured the vocals by Ms. Dynamite.

In May 2015, Diztortion scored another hit with Lethal Bizzle on "Fester Skank", the song reached number 11 in the OCC UK Charts. The record was also used in the BT Sport Advertisement for the UEFA Champions League.

Diztortion also produced the track "Peak" for Tinie Tempah in 2015, a track which featured UK rappers Stormzy and Bugsy Malone

Other notable releases in 2015 include "My Number 1" by Stylo G featuring Gyptian a record Diztortion co-wrote with Stylo G, and the Lethal Bizzle featuring Shakka single "Playground" which was another Diztortion produced single.

On 24 August 2015, it was announced that Diztortion had collaborated with drum and bass duo Sigma on a track called "Redemption" which features vocals from Jacob Banks

In July 2016, Diztortion posted images of himself in the studio with Rita Ora and Norwegian production duo Stargate- they are rumoured to have been working on the new Rita Ora Album.

On 4 August 2016 Diztortion was seen in the studio working with US singer Kelly Clarkson on her new album.

On 22 October Jamaican Reggae artist Sean Paul confirmed that the track "Mad Love" (Watch The Tempo) would be a part if his new forthcoming project being released via Island Records. He also confirmed the track will feature vocals from Shakira and was co written/produced by Diztortion and songwriting giants- David Guetta Giorgio Tunifort, Ina Wroldsen and Emily Warren.

Production and songwriting credits

2013
Stylo G – "Soundbwoy"
Lethal Bizzle featuring Wiley – "They Got It Wrong"
Lethal Bizzle featuring Ruby Goe – "Party Right"
Baby Blue – "Soapbox"
Bashy – "The World"
Stylo G – "Badd"
Lethal Bizzle – "Hammrd"

2014
Cashtastic – "Life On The Edge"
Cashtastic – "Panicking"
Lethal Bizzle featuring Cherri Voncelle – "The Drop"
Lethal Bizzle featuring JME and Tempa – T "Rari WorkOut"
Diztortion featuring Ms. Dynamite – "Bandalero"

2015
Cashtastic – "808"
Lethal Bizzle featuring Diztortion – "Fester Skank"
Tinie Tempah featuring Stormzy and Bugzy Malone – "Peak"
Diztortion featuring Sasha Keable and Stylo G – "Put Your Love On Me"
Lethal Bizzle featuring Shakka – "Playground"
Lethal Bizzle  featuring Stormzy: "Dude"
Sigma and Diztortion featuring Jacob Banks – Redemption"
Stylo G feat. Gyptian – "My Number One"

2016
Lethal Bizzle; "Boxx"
Diztortion ft Bennie Man & Melissa Steel; "I'll Be There"
Lethal Bizzle – "Wobble"
Last Night In Paris – "Been A Minute"
Professor Green; "One Eye On The Door"
Taya; "Deeper"
Diztortion feat. Avelino; "On A Wave"

2020
Swerve by KSI, featured on his album All over the Place

Remix credits

 Baby Blue – "Bump"
 Charlie Brown – "Bones"
 Stoshee – "My Music Man"
 Tanya Lacey – "Now That Your Gone"
 Stylo G – "Move Back"
 New World Sound featuring Lethal Bizzle – "Flutes VIP"
 Sinead Harnett featuring Wiley – "Do It Any Way"
 DJ Fresh & High Contrast feat. Dizzee Rascal; "How Love Begins"

References

 https://itunes.apple.com/gb/album/soundbwoy-ep/id633531783
 https://itunes.apple.com/gb/album/party-right-feat.-ruby-goe/id671827723
 https://itunes.apple.com/gb/album/they-got-it-wrong-feat.-wiley/id619863478
 https://web.archive.org/web/20140627215508/http://mobo.com/news-blogs/interview-stylo-g
 https://www.theguardian.com/music/2013/may/16/stylo-g-soundbwoy-light-up-summer
 
 http://www.digitalspy.co.uk/music/news/a665080/listen-to-sigma-and-diztortions-dynamic-new-single-redemption.html#~pmIsfoTpnqo1Cw
 http://rwdmag.com/sigma-diztortion-team-up-for-redemption-with-jacob-banks/
 http://pigeonsandplanes.com/2015/08/premiere-sinead-harnett-ft-wiley-do-it-anyway-diztortion-remix/

Dutch record producers
Dutch people of Surinamese descent
1990 births
Living people
Musicians from Amsterdam